Sincerely Yours, Dhaka is a 2018 Impress Telefilm drama film produced as Bangladesh's first anthology film directed by eleven individual directors. It is a collection of gritty shorts centered on the capital city of Bangladesh, Dhaka, and the people living in its margins. It was awarded "Best Original Screenplay" at the 11th edition of the Jaipur International Film Festival (JIFF), held from January 18 to 22, 2019 in Jaipur, India. It is one of the first two films to enter Netflix originating from Bangladesh. It was selected as the Bangladeshi entry for Best International Feature Film at the 93rd Academy Awards, but it was not nominated. It was also screened at 51st International Film Festival of India in January 2021 in Country in focus section.

Plot
In this omnibus, 11 Bangladeshi filmmakers created a love letter to the city of Dhaka representing their point of view of the lifestyle of the residents and the  frequent happenings in the city.

1. The Background Artist (Nuhash Humayun) : The story is about a movie side character who are called extras.

2. Cheers (Syed Ahmed Shawki) : This story is based on psychological resentment of a girl after a breakup in love.

3. Jibon's Gun (Rahat Rahman) : A story about a teenaged gangster in Dhaka.

4. Magfirat (Robiul Alam Robi) : The story is about a car driver whose mentality get dramatically changed while working in Dhaka.

5. Sounds Good (Golam Kibria Farooki) : The whole movie set has been highlighted in the eyes of the movie soundman.

6. Obisshashe Dhaka (Mir Mukarram Hussain) : It is portrayed that going to help someone in Dhaka can turn into a danger to oneself.

7. Where, Nowhere (Tanvir Ahsan) :
The director has beautifully told 3 tragic stories of a middle-class family in Dhaka.

8. Dhaka Metro (Mahmud Hasan) : The story is about a second hand car dealer whose wife is ill but the car that would be sold for her surgery gets stolen.

9. M for Money / Murder (Abdullah Al Noor) : A story of the tragic fate of 2 corrupt industrialists.

10. Jinnah is Dead (Krishnendu Chattyapadhay) : The story is about the conflict between a Bihari mether and a Bengali resident in Bihari Camp, Mohammadpur, Dhaka.

11. Juthi (Syed Saleh Ahmed Sobhan) : It is a story about the complex psychology between men and women.

Cast

 Fazlur Rahman Babu
 Johan
 Shamsi Sayeka
 Irfan Sajjad
 Naziba Bashar
 Orchita Sporshia
 Tanin Tanha
 Yash Rohan
 Ashok Bepari
 Mir Naufel Ashrafi Jisan
 Allen Shuvro
 Mushfiq Farhan
 Taufiqul Hasan Nihal
 Abidur Rahman Adour
 Rushnaf Wadud
 Anis Uz Zaman
 Shipon Hassan Akash
 Shah Tushar
 Bijoy Sikder
 Lutfur Rahman Hamim
 Mustafa Kamal Himel
 Rafiqul Alam
 Razan
 Prapto
 Shamol Mawla
 Farhana Hamid
 Mehedi Ansari
 Sohana Saba
 Nurur Rahman Bachchu
 Mohammad Pavel
 Akib Ahmed
 Sardar Saniat Hossain
 Shahtaj Monira Hashem
 Mahmuda Apon
 Rodela Rangan Riddo
 Mohammed Rakibul Hasan Reza
 Manoj Kumar Pramanik
 Dilruba Hossain Doyel
 Aref Syed
 Sharmeen Akhee
 Bappi Amin
 Arman
 Azaz Bari
 Khairul Basar
 Intekhab Dinar
 Kazi Toufiqul Islam Emon
 Lutfur Rahman George
 Elora Gohor
 Mahmudul Hasan
 Rawnak Hasan
 Ishtiaq Hassan
 Maruf Hassan
 Muktar Hossain
 Robin Khan
 Tropa Mazumder
 Mostafa Monwar
 Safa Nomoni
 Robayet Hossain Ovi
 Saiful Islam Saiful
 Hasib Shahriar
 Snata Shahreen
 Gousul Alam Shaon
 Shahnaz Sumi
 Nusrat Imrose Tisha
 Shatabdi Wadud
 Waziha
 Iresh Zaker
 Pavel Zaman

See also
 List of submissions to the 93rd Academy Awards for Best International Feature Film
 List of Bangladeshi submissions for the Academy Award for Best International Feature Film

References

External links
 Official site

2018 films
Bengali-language Bangladeshi films
Bangladeshi anthology films
2010s Bengali-language films